The Action at Bir el Gubi (December 1941) was fought near Bir el Gubi, Libya, between 3 and 7 December 1941, between Italian (later reinforced by German) and Commonwealth forces. It followed the Action at Bir el Gubi (November 1941) a failed Allied attempt to capture Bir el Gubi two weeks' previous. Bir el Gubi was a tactical position whose fall would have allowed the Allies to outflank the German-Italian forces in Cyrenaica. The battle was part of Operation Crusader.

Background 
On 18 November, north of Bir el Gubi, Commonwealth forces started a new offensive, Operation Crusader. On 19 November the 132nd Armored Division "Ariete" repulsed in the Action at Bir el Gubi (November 1941) a British attack and on 23 November a great tank battle,  Totensonntag ("Sunday of the Dead" in German), took place in the desert. The Battalion Group "Giovani Fascisti" and some Bersaglieri units took position in Bir el Gubi. A tank company of the I Battalion of the 32nd Tank Infantry Regiment of the Ariete with ten Fiat L3 tankettes and two M13/40 medium tanks was also sent in support.

The Italian soldiers strengthened the existing fortifications, building machine gun and anti-tank gun posts, building barbed wire barriers and digging holes in the ground. These fortifications allowed Bir el Gubi to be defended from attackers coming from any direction. One of the two M13/40s and some of the L3 tankettes, immobilized by mechanical breakdowns, were interred and used as defensive positions. The soldiers took position in the holes in the evening of 1 December, under torrential rain. The garrison also had ten 47/32 mm guns, 24 Breda Mod. 37 machine guns, 12 Mod. 35 anti-tank rifles, six Solothurn S-18/100 anti-tank rifles and eight 81 mm mortars.

Action 
Following the withdrawal of 2nd NZ Division General Neil Ritchie had reorganised his rear echelon units to release to the front line 4th Indian Infantry Division's 5th and the 22nd Guards Brigade. By 3 December 11th Indian Brigade (belonging to the 4th Indian Infantry Division) was heavily engaged in action against a strongpoint near Bir el Gubi, some 25 miles south of Ed Duda. The 1st and 2nd Battalions of the Italian Battalion Group "Giovani Fascisti" from this hilltop position fought off repeated attacks by the British armour and Indian infantry units during the first week of December.
At 12:00 on 3 December, Allied artillery started shelling the Italian positions, causing some losses (among them Major Fulvio Balisti, commander of the I Battalion of the Battalion Group "Giovani Fascisti", who was wounded). During the night, all the Italian units outside of the perimeter of Bir el Gubi were captured, along with their vehicles and equipment.

In the morning of 4 December, the Allied forces launched two attacks against Bir el Gubi. Hundreds of men from the Queen's Own Cameron Highlanders (part of the 11th Indian Infantry Brigade), supported by tanks and by an artillery barrage, attacked the positions of the I Battalion, while the rest of the 11th Indian Brigade, supported by Valentine tanks of the 7th Armoured Division, attacked the lines of the II Battalion, further north. Both attacks were repelled, and the attackers left dozens of killed on the ground; they did manage, however, to encircle the Italian positions. Around 14:00 on the same day, a third attack was launched against the Italian lines; the Italian defenders resisted for several hours in the face of increasing infantry and artillery pressure, but in the evening the 4th Company had to abandon Point 188 and withdrew to Point 184.

The L3 tankettes proved useful against infantry, thanks to their two machine guns and their armour, but were powerless against tanks, and all ten of them were destroyed. General Willoughby Norrie had an overwhelming superiority in the area, but he failed to concentrate and co-ordinate the action of his forces. The Italians, instead, effectively coordinated the action of their infantry, artillery, and light tanks.

During the fighting, Colonel Ferdinando Tanucci, commander of the Giovani Fascisti, was wounded; Lieutenant Colonel Alfred George Butler, of Rajputana Rifles, was killed. Between 4 and 7 December the XXX British Corps launched seven attacks, all repelled with heavy losses by the Italian defenders. Hunger and lack of supplies, however, started to weaken the Italian garrison, which asked for reinforcements; Erwin Rommel decided to send armoured forces (15th and 21st Panzer Divisions) to support the Italians in Bir el Gubi.

At dawn on 5 December, the first German armoured units arrive near Point 188, which they recaptured after a fiery clash between German and British tanks. After this, the German tanks headed towards Bir el Gubi. The Ariete and Trieste Divisions were also sent, but the former was stopped by an Allied attack, and the latter lost its way in the desert. The Indian Brigade was broken and had to be withdrawn to refit and arrangements made to bring 22nd Guards Brigade into their place.

Tank clashes continued; during the following night the Ariete Division managed to reach Bir el Gubi and joined the German Panzers of general Ludwig Crüwell, and their combined force repelled the last British attacks. With the arrival of the Ariete, the Commonwealth force had lost its numerical superiority and withdrew ending the Action.

Aftermath
Crüwell had lost the opportunity to strike a heavy blow on 6 December as 4th Armoured Brigade (part of the 7th Armoured Division) made no move to close up to 22nd Guards Brigade; he waited too long, and on 7 December the 4th Armoured Brigade closed up. Walter Neumann-Silkow, the commander of the 15th Panzer Division, was mortally wounded late on the 6th. Axis forces were later forced to abandon Bir el Gubi with the progress of Operation Crusader.

See also 
 List of British military equipment of World War II
 List of Italian military equipment in World War II
 List of German military equipment of World War II

References

Sources
 

Conflicts in 1941
1941 in Libya
Western Desert campaign
Bir el Gubi
Battles of World War II involving Italy
Battles of World War II involving Germany
December 1941 events